Arantxa Sánchez Vicario and Larisa Savchenko were the defending champions but did not compete that year.

Amanda Coetzer and Inés Gorrochategui won in the final 6–2, 3–6, 6–2 against Nicole Arendt and Manon Bollegraf.

Seeds
Champion seeds are indicated in bold text while text in italics indicates the round in which those seeds were eliminated. The top four seeded teams received byes into the second round.

Draw

Final

Top half

Bottom half

External links
 ITF tournament edition details

Amelia Island Championships
1995 WTA Tour